Norbert Janzon (born 21 December 1950) is a retired German footballer. He spent ten seasons in the Bundesliga with Hertha BSC, Kickers Offenbach, Karlsruher SC, FC Bayern Munich and FC Schalke 04.

Honours
 Bundesliga champion: 1979–80, 1980–81

References

External links
 

1950 births
Living people
German footballers
Germany B international footballers
Hertha BSC players
Kickers Offenbach players
Karlsruher SC players
FC Bayern Munich footballers
FC Schalke 04 players
Bundesliga players
2. Bundesliga players
Association football forwards
Footballers from Berlin